Charlie Chaplin 2 is a 2019 Indian Tamil-language action comedy film directed by Shakthi Chidambaram. The film stars Prabhu Deva, Nikki Galrani and Prabhu. The film is a sequel to 2002 film Charlie Chaplin. The music for the film is scored by Amresh Ganesh. The film is produced by T. Siva under the production banner Amma Creations. The film released on 25 January 2019.

Cast 

Prabhu Deva as Thiru
Prabhu as Ramakrishnan
Nikki Galrani as Sara
Adah Sharma as "Psychology" Saara
Vivek Prasanna as Dubai Raja
Aravind Akash as Akash
Chandhana Raj as Mahi
T. Siva as Chidambaram 
Senthi Kumari as Thanga Lakshmi
Ravi Mariya as Bullet Pushparaj
Luthfudeen as "Mimicry" Manish
Dev Gill as Smuggler
Samir Kochhar as Cellphone Bazaar owner
Crane Manohar as MLA 
Kavya Suresh as MLA's wife
Chaams as Homosexual man
Scissor Manohar as Bullet Pushparaj's assistant
Velmurugan as Bullet Pushparaj's assistant
Komal Sharma
Amit Bhargav as Sara's sister's husband
Ashvin Raja as Hotel worker
Golisoda Seetha as Sumangali

Soundtrack
Soundtrack was composed by Amresh Ganesh. Senthil Ganesh and Rajalakshmi who won the finals of Vijay TV Super Singer sang their own song "Chinna Machan" for the film. The song became a huge chartbuster. Prabhu Deva made his debut as lyricist with this film for the song "Ivala Romba". Soundtrack was released under the label Saregama.

"Chinna Machan" – Senthil Ganesh, Rajalakshmi (Lyrics : Chella Thangaiah)
"Ivala Romba" – Amresh Ganesh
"Mamu Mamu" – Amresh Ganesh
"I Want To Marry You" – K. B. Mahadevan, Adah Sharma and K. Dasgupta

Release 
Charlie Chaplin 2 was released on 25 January 2019. The satellite rights of the film is sold to Sun TV.

Marketing 
The official trailer of the film was unveiled by popular director Karthik Subbaraj on 15 January 2019 on the eve of Thai Pongal.

References

External links 

Indian comedy films
Indian sequel films
2010s Tamil-language films
2019 films
Films directed by Sakthi Chidambaram